Issa Kassim (born 21 December 1975) is a Kenyan footballer. He played in 26 matches for the Kenya national football team from 2000 to 2004. He was also named in Kenya's squad for the 2004 African Cup of Nations tournament.

References

1975 births
Living people
Kenyan footballers
Kenya international footballers
2004 African Cup of Nations players
Place of birth missing (living people)
Association football goalkeepers
Mumias Sugar F.C. players